Nathaniel Ryan Morris (born October 16, 1980) is an American entrepreneur. He is the Chairman and CEO of Lexington, Kentucky-based company Morris Industries. He also founded the company Rubicon Technologies, where he formerly served as CEO.

Early life
Originally from Lexington, Morris grew up in Louisville, Kentucky with his single mother, Miranda Morris, and maternal grandparents. He was close to his grandfather, Lewis Sexton, who was a former president of the Ford plant United Auto Workers union in Louisville. While attending Eastern High School, Morris reportedly developed political aspirations after multiple spinal fractures derailed his hopes of a football career in the fall of 1996.

Beginning in 1999, Morris attended George Washington University on a academic scholarship from the Ancient and Accepted Scottish Rite of Freemasonry in Washington, D.C., where he studied international affairs. Morris attended graduate school at the Princeton School of Public and International Affairs. Morris also attended University of Oxford’s Said Business School and is a member of the Oxford Union.

Early career and politics
Morris is a Republican and is noted as a political fundraiser. Morris raised over $50,000 for President George W. Bush's 2004 reelection campaign. He has worked in a variety of roles for several Kentucky Republicans, including Congresswoman Anne Northup, Gov. Ernie Fletcher, Senate Majority Leader Mitch McConnell and Labor Secretary Elaine Chao (McConnell's wife).

Morris is a friend and supporter of U.S Senator Rand Paul. He traveled with Paul to Israel in 2013 and raised money for his Senate and presidential campaigns, becoming one of his top fund-raisers.

Business
Morris founded Rubicon Technologies, formerly known as Rubicon Global, in 2008 after collaborating with a high school friend, Marc Spiegel. The company is focused on business-to-business and municipal waste and recycling services. Rubicon became a public company in August of 2022, listing on the New York Stock Exchange under the ticker symbol RBT.

Mr. Morris stepped down as Rubicon's CEO on October 13th, 2022 following a decrease in the stock's share price from $7.94 at IPO to $1.37. CTO Phil Rodoni succeeded Morris as CEO. Morris retained a consulting role, served as Chairman of the Board, and transitioned to a seat on the board of directors.

Morris is the Chairman and CEO of Morris Industries, based in Lexington, Kentucky.

Personal life
Morris married Jane Mosbacher on New Year's Eve 2011. She is the daughter of Robert Mosbacher Jr., the head of the Overseas Private Investment Corporation under George W. Bush, and granddaughter of George H. W. Bush's commerce secretary Robert Mosbacher Sr.

References

1980 births
Businesspeople from Lexington, Kentucky
Eastern High School (Louisville, Kentucky) alumni
George Washington University alumni
Princeton School of Public and International Affairs alumni
Kentucky Republicans
Living people
21st-century American businesspeople
American chairpersons of corporations
American environmentalists
American philanthropists
Sustainability advocates